One Man Band is a song by the Who's lead singer, Roger Daltrey from his debut solo studio album Daltrey. The song was written by David Courtney and Leo Sayer, and features Daltrey's acoustic guitar strumming. According to Daltrey, it "reminiscences of Shepherd's Bush" [A place in west London where Daltrey had grown up and The Who were formed] and became one of the highlights of the album, and later being released as a single in its own right in some European territories.

The song was recorded by Leo Sayer a year later on his solo album Just a Boy and released as a single, which became one of Sayer's biggest hits, peaking at number 6 in the UK, and placing in the top 10 in South Africa.

References

1973 singles
1973 songs
1974 singles
Leo Sayer songs
MCA Records singles
Polydor Records singles
Songs written by David Courtney
Songs written by Leo Sayer
Track Records singles